{{safesubst:#invoke:RfD|||month = March
|day = 16
|year = 2023
|time = 18:17
|timestamp = 20230316181740

|content=
REDIRECT Simon & Schuster

}}